Creamy is an album recorded by American jazz saxophonist Johnny Hodges featuring performances with members of the Duke Ellington Orchestra recorded in 1955 and released on the Norgran label.

Reception

The AllMusic site awarded the album 4 stars out of 5 and noted "While there are no real surprises anywhere on this record, it is well worth acquiring".

Track listing
All compositions by Johnny Hodges, except as indicated.
 "The Ballad Medley: Whispering/Tenderly/Don't Take Your Love from Me/Prelude to a Kiss/Polka Dots and Moonbeams/Passion Flower" (Vincent Rose, John Schonberger, Richard Coburn/Walter Gross, Jack Lawrence/Henry Nemo/Duke Ellington, Irving Gordon, Irving Mills/Jimmy Van Heusen, Johnny Burke/Billy Strayhorn) - 15:19
 "Scufflin'" (Cue Hodges) - 8:13
 "Honey Bunny" - 6:37
 "Passion" (Strayhorn) - 3:20
 "Pretty Little Girl" (Strayhorn) - 2:28
 "No Use Kicking" - 10:32

Personnel
Johnny Hodges - alto saxophone
Clark Terry - trumpet
Lawrence Brown - trombone
Jimmy Hamilton - clarinet, tenor saxophone
Harry Carney - baritone saxophone
Billy Strayhorn - piano
Jimmy Woode - bass
Sonny Greer - drums

References

1955 albums
Johnny Hodges albums
Norgran Records albums
Albums produced by Norman Granz